The Georgia O'Keeffe Home and Studio is a historic house museum in Abiquiú, New Mexico.  From 1943 until her death, it was the principal residence and studio of artist Georgia O'Keeffe (1887–1986).  It is now part of the Georgia O'Keeffe Museum, which has sites in Santa Fe and Abiquiú. Public tours are available March–November, with advance tickets required. The Home and Studio became a National Historic Landmark in 1998, as one of the most important artistic sites in the southwestern United States.

Description and history
The Georgia O'Keeffe Home and Studio is located in the small unincorporated village of Abiquiú, near the St. Thomas Church.  The building is a single-story adobe structure, largely built in the traditional style.  It has thick adobe walls, and a flat roof supported by a network of vigas and latillas (smaller wooden elements crossing the larger viga beams).  The house is organized in wings a single room deep, which surround a central patio/plaza.  The house has a number of modernist elements, including skylights and large picture windows that provide expansive views of the surrounding landscape and brought natural light into areas that such houses traditionally did not have.  O'Keeffe was insistent on these types of deviations from the traditional form, stating in an interview that "I didn't want a Spanish house; I didn't want an Indian house, [or] a Mexican house; I wanted my house!"

Portions of the house are believed to date to the 1730s, and it was in deteriorating condition when Georgia O'Keeffe first spotted it in the 1930s.  At the time, it was owned by the Roman Catholic church, which did not want to sell it.  It eventually relented, and O'Keeffe was able to purchase it in 1943.  She undertook to rehabilitate and modernize the property, work that was a collaborative effort with her friend Maria Chabot.  This work was completed in 1946, at which time O'Keeffe made it her permanent home. Included in the compound is a smaller outbuilding which was her principal studio space.

The house remained O'Keeffe's primary residence until 1984, when she moved to Santa Fe two years prior to her death at age 98.  In 1989, the Georgia O'Keeffe Foundation became owner and manager of the Abiquiú property. It is now owned and managed by the Georgia O'Keeffe Museum.

The property was declared a National Historic Landmark in 1998.

See also

Ghost Ranch, where O'Keeffe also owned property
National Register of Historic Places in Rio Arriba County, New Mexico
List of National Historic Landmarks in New Mexico

References

External links

, Georgia O'Keeffe Museum
Georgia O'Keeffe Home and Studio, National Park Service

Art museums and galleries in New Mexico
Artists' studios in the United States
O'Keeffe
O'Keeffe
Houses completed in 1946
O'Keeffe
O'Keeffe, Georgia, Home and Studio
Museums in Rio Arriba County, New Mexico
O'Keeffe, Georgia, Home and Studio
O'Keeffe
Houses in Rio Arriba County, New Mexico
National Register of Historic Places in Rio Arriba County, New Mexico
Georgia O'Keeffe
O'Keeffe